Abd Al-Aziz Fawzan Al-Fawzan (Arabic: فوزان، عبد العزيز بن فوزان بن صالح) is an Islamic scholar and author in Saudi Arabia. He is also known as Abd al-Aziz b. Fawzan al-Fawzan, Abd Al-Aziz Al-Fawzan.

Background and education
He is a Saudi Professor of Islamic Law at Imam Muhammad ibn Saud Islamic University and a member of the Teacher's Board, al-Imam University. In the past, he taught at the Institute of Islamic and Arabic Sciences in America (IIASA).

Al-Fawzan speaks frequently on Saudi TV, and has reportedly been highly critical of Christianity and the United States.

In 2005, of Christians he has reportedly said, "Someone who denies Allah, worships Christ, son of Mary, and claims that God is one third of a trinity – so you like these things he says and does? Don’t you hate the faith of such a polytheist who says God is one third of a trinity, or who worships Christ, son of Mary?" He further commented that Muslims should have positive hatred, which is to feel compassion and mercy and to try to help people convert to Islam and submit to one god.

In October 2008, on America and the financial crisis of 2007–2008, he said, "America is collapsing, according to the same scenario of the Russian collapse."

In 2017, he was included on a death list by the Islamic State.

References

Living people
Saudi Arabian Sunni Muslim scholars of Islam
Saudi Arabian imams
Critics of Christianity
Critics of Shia Islam
Saudi Arabian Salafis
Saudi Arabian scholars
21st-century Muslim scholars of Islam
Alumni of the University of Wales
Quran translators
Imam Muhammad ibn Saud Islamic University alumni
Academic staff of Imam Muhammad ibn Saud Islamic University
21st-century translators
1964 births